Lebyazhy is a rural locality (a khutor) in Kletsko-Pochtovskoye Rural Settlement, Serafimovichsky District, Volgograd Oblast, Russia. The population was 3 as of 2010.

Geography 
Lebyazhy is located 92 km southeast of Serafimovich (the district's administrative centre) by road. Vyezdinsky is the nearest rural locality.

References 

Rural localities in Serafimovichsky District